Wierzbica  is a village in the administrative district of Gmina Radziemice, within Proszowice County, Lesser Poland Voivodeship, in southern Poland.

The village has a population of 180.

References

Wierzbica